William Beers may refer to:

 William George Beers (1843–1900), Canadian dentist referred to as the "father of modern lacrosse"
 William L. Beers (1904–1955), American politician in Connecticut